Collingwood Bay is a bay on the coast of Oro Province, Papua New Guinea.

Bays of Papua New Guinea